Cassie is a feminine given name and a short form of various other given names mostly used in English-speaking countries. It is more rarely a surname. People and fictional characters named Cassie include:

People with the name

Given name or nickname

Entertainment
 Cassie Davis (born 1986), Australian singer, songwriter and producer
 Cassie Gaines (1948–1977), American singer
 Cassie Jaye (born 1986), American actress and film director
 Cassie Powney (born 1983), British actor
 Cassie Ramone (born 1986), American rock guitarist and singer
 Cassie Scerbo (born 1990), American actress, singer and dancer
 Cassie Steele (born 1989), Canadian actress and singer-songwriter
 Cassie Taylor (born 1986), American singer-songwriter and blues musician
 Cassie Ventura (born 1986), known mononymously as Cassie, American recording artist, model, actress and dancer
 Cassie Yates (born 1951), American actress

Sports
 Cassie Andrews (cricketer) (1908-1962), Australian cricketer
 Cassie Campbell (born 1973), Canadian ice hockey player
 Cassie Chadwick (1857–1907), alias used by Canadian fraud artist Elizabeth Bigley
 Cassie Hager (born 1984), American basketball player
 Cassie Jackman (born 1972), English squash player
 Cassie Law, American rugby player
 Cassie Mitchell (born 1981), American chemist, professor and Paralympic discus thrower and cyclist
 Cassie Patten (born 1987), British freestyle swimmer
 Cassandra Potter (born 1981), American curler
 Cassie Sharpe (born 1992), Canadian freestyle skier
 Cassy Vericel (born 1991), French former artistic gymnast

Writing and journalism
 Cassie Brown (1919–1986), journalist, author, publisher and editor
 Cassie Edwards (born 1936), American romance novelist
 Catherine Mackin (1939-1982), pioneer woman journalist in American television network broadcasting
 Cassie Stocks, Canadian writer

Other people with the name 
 Cassie Bernall (1981–1999), student killed in the Columbine High School massacre
 Cassey Eggelton (born 1952), Cook Islands politician and former cabinet minister
 Cassey Ho, American social-media fitness entrepreneur
 Cassie Kozyrkov, data scientist and science communicator
 Cassandra Cassy O'Connor (born 1967), Australian politician
 Cassie Jo Stoddart (1989-2006), American murder victim
 Cassie, a ring name of Peyton Royce, Australian model and professional wrestler, born Cassie McIntosh in 1992

Surname
 A. B. D. Cassie, scientist, after whom Cassie's law was named
 Alice Mary Cassie (1887–1963) New Zealand political activist and feminist
 James Cassie (1819–1879), Scottish painter
 Meryl Cassie (born 1984), South African-born actress and aspiring singer
 William Fisher Cassie (1905-1985), British civil engineer and academic

Fictional characters
 Cassie, from the science-fiction book series Animorphs
 Cassy, from the cartoon series Ultimate Book of Spells
 Cassie Aganovic, from the book Finding Cassie Crazy
 Cassie Ainsworth, from the television series Skins
 Cassie Blake, from novel and television show The Secret Circle
 Cassie Brady, from the soap opera Days of our Lives
 Cassie Cage, daughter of Johnny Cage and Sonya Blade from the Mortal Kombat video game series
 Cassie Cain, a.k.a. Black Bat, from DC Comics
 Cassie Callison, in the soap opera One Life to Live
 Cassie Carpenter, in the BBC soap opera EastEnders
 Cassie Chan, from the Power Rangers universe
 Cassie 'Cow' Cowan, in the public information film Cow
 Cassie Dunleavy, in the television series The 4400
 Cassie Hack, in the Hack/Slash comic books
 Cassie Howard, in the HBO series Euphoria
 Cassie Keller, protagonist of the 2007 film The Haunting Hour: Don't Think About It
 Cassie Lang, a.k.a. Stature, from Marvel Comics
 Cassie Logan, one of the main characters in the book Roll of Thunder, Hear My Cry
 Cassie Munro, a character in the 2006 film RV (film) 
 Cassie Newman, former character on the soap opera The Young and the Restless
 Cassie Palmer, in the Cassandra Palmer novel series
 Cassie Rose, a supporting character in Minecraft Story Mode
 Cassie Sandsmark, a.k.a. Wonder Girl, from DC Comics
 Cassie St. Commons, Dusk (comics) in the Marvel Comics universe
 Cassie Sullivan, from the trilogy and movie The 5th Wave 
 Cassie Turner, from the Australian television soap opera Home and Away
 Cassie Layne Winslow, from the former CBS daytime soap opera Guiding Light
 Cassie Newton, from the television series Buffy the Vampire Slayer
 Cassie Lenue, from the television series Elementary

See also
 Casandra
 Cassandra (disambiguation)
 Cassey (disambiguation)
 Cassi (disambiguation)
 Cassiopeia (disambiguation)
 Kassandra (disambiguation) (includes Kasandra)
 Kassi (disambiguation)
 Kassie (disambiguation)

Feminine given names
Lists of people by nickname
Hypocorisms